Severino Bernardini (Domodossola, 31 March 1966) is a former Italian long-distance runner who specialized in the marathon race.

He won two medals at the World Marathon Cup, and Italian Marathon in 1990.

Biography
Severino Bernardini participated at one edition of the European Championships (1994), he has 8 caps in national team from 1987 to 1996.

Achievements

National titles
Severino Bernardini has won one time the individual national championship.
1 win in marathon (1988)

References

External links
 
 Severino Bernardini at All-athletics.com

1966 births
Living people
Italian male long-distance runners
Italian male marathon runners
Italian male mountain runners
20th-century Italian people